The 2003 Continental Cup of Curling was held at Fort William Gardens in Thunder Bay, Ontario November 27–30. Europe won its first title, 208-179.

Teams

Europe
 Peja Lindholm, Tomas Nordin, Magnus Swartling, Peter Narup
 Jackie Lockhart, Sheila Swan, Katriona Fairweather, Anne Laird
 Hammy McMillan, Norman Brown, Hugh Aitken, Roger McIntyre
 Anette Norberg, Eva Lund, Cathrine Lindahl, Helena Lingham
 Dordi Nordby, Hanne Woods, Marianne Haslum, Camilla Holth
 Pål Trulsen, Lars Vågberg, Flemming Davanger, Bent Ånund Ramsfjell

North America
 Mark Dacey, Bruce Lohnes, Rob Harris, Andrew Gibson
 David Nedohin, Randy Ferbey, Scott Pfeifer, Marcel Rocque
 Pete Fenson, Eric Fenson, Shawn Rojeski, John Shuster
 Colleen Jones, Kim Kelly, Mary-Anne Arsenault, Nancy Delahunt
 Debbie McCormick, Allison Pottinger, Ann Swisshelm Silver, Tracy Sachtjen
 Sherry Middaugh, Kirsten Wall, Andrea Lawes, Sheri Cordina

Mixed doubles
(Each game worth six points)

North America (Ferbey/Wall) 8-6 Europe (Nordby/Vågberg)
North America (Jones/Lohnes) 11-4 Europe (McMillan/Swan)
North America (Dacey/Kelly) 9-8 Europe (Nordin/Norberg)
Europe (Lockhart/Brown) 7-4 North America (P. Fenson/Pottinger)
North America (Nedohin/Middaugh) 9-3 Europe (Lindholm/Lund)
Europe (Trulsen/Woods) 8-6 (McCormick/E. Fenson)

North America wins 24-12

Women's team
(Each game worth six points)

Europe (Lockhart) 5-4 North America (Jones)
North America (Middaugh) 5-4 Europe (Nordby)
Europe (Norberg) 6-2 North America (McCormick)
Europe (Norberg) 6-5 North America (Middaugh)
North America (McCormick) 10-7 Europe (Nordby)
Europe (Lockhart) 5-3 North America (Jones)

Europe wins 24-12

Men's team
(Each game worth six points)

North America (Fenson) 6-3 Europe (Trulsen)
North America (Ferbey) 5-3 Europe (McMillan)
Europe (Lindholm) 7-2 North America (Dacey)
Europe (Lindholm) 5-3 North America (Ferbey)
North America (Dacey) 5-3 Europe (McMillan)
Europe (Trulsen) 10-1 North America (Fenson)

Tie 18-18

Singles
(Each game worth four points, eight bonus points awarded to top aggregate score)

North America (Wall) 14-13 Europe (Norberg)
Europe (Haslum) 15-7 North America (Jones)
North America (McCormick) 14-12 Europe (Lockhart)
Europe (Swartling) 22-19 North America (Pfeifer)
North America (P. Fenson) 17-15 Europe (Davanger)
Europe (McMillan) 19-17 North America (Dacey)

Europe wins 20-12

Women's skins
(Each skin is worth one point)

North America (McCormick) 23-7 Europe (Nordby)
North America (Jones) 23-17 Europe (Lockhart)
Europe (Norberg) 60-0 North America (Middaugh)

Europe wins 84-46

Men's skins
(Each skin is worth one point)

Europe (McMillan) 16-14 North America (Fenson)
North America (Dacey) 23-17 Europe (Trulsen)
North America (Ferbey) 30-17 Europe (Lindhom) (game not completed)

North America wins 67-50

Europe wins aggregate 208-179

Curling
Continental Cup of Curling
Sports competitions in Thunder Bay
Curling in Northern Ontario
2003 in Canadian curling
2003 in Ontario
November 2003 sports events in Canada